The 2022–23 season was the 35th season of Churchill Brothers in existence and Fourteenth in the I-League. A new coach for the team, Antonio Rueda, was appointed on 19 February 2022.

Transfers 

In

Out

Pre-season

I-League

Super Cup

Qualifiers

Current squad

First-team squad

Technical staff

Competitions

I-League

Squad statistics 

|}

References

Churchill Brothers FC Goa seasons
2022–23 I-League by team